International Record Review was an independent British monthly classical music magazine.

First published in March 2000, and defunct by April 2015 according to its website, the magazine reviewed classical music CDs, DVDs and books. Its format was similar to that of its competitors, the long established Gramophone and the more recent BBC Music Magazine: CD and DVD reviews were divided into orchestral, chamber, instrumental, choral, vocal and opera. Reviews in International Record Review were more detailed than those appearing in Gramophone and BBC Music Magazine.

Each issue contained a list of new releases and at least one feature article.

Following the death in February 2015 of the magazine's publisher and the sole director of International Record Review Limited, Barry Irving, the company declared itself insolvent in letters to its associates and on its website.

References

External links
Magazine Website
Reviews of the first issue

2000 establishments in the United Kingdom
2015 disestablishments in the United Kingdom
Classical music magazines
Defunct magazines published in the United Kingdom
Magazines established in 2000
Magazines disestablished in 2015
Magazines published in London
Monthly magazines published in the United Kingdom
Music magazines published in the United Kingdom